The 44th General Assembly of Nova Scotia represented Nova Scotia between March 21, 1950, and April 14, 1953.

Division of seats

There were 37 members of the General Assembly elected in the 1949 Nova Scotia general election.

List of members

Former members of the 44th General Assembly

References 

 Canadian Parliamentary Guide, 1949, PG Normandin

Terms of the General Assembly of Nova Scotia
1949 establishments in Nova Scotia
1953 disestablishments in Nova Scotia
20th century in Nova Scotia